The 2010 Macau Grand Prix Formula Three was the 57th Macau Grand Prix race to be held on the streets of Macau. It was held on 21 November 2010, and was the 28th edition for Formula Three cars. The race was supported by the 2010 Guia Race of Macau, the final round of the World Touring Car Championship season.

Having already claimed pole position and the qualifying race, Signature driver Edoardo Mortara became the first driver to win back-to-back Formula Three Grands Prix, finishing ahead of teammate Laurens Vanthoor, with Valtteri Bottas third for Prema Powerteam.

Entry list
 All drivers competed in Dallara F308 chassis.

Report

Practice and qualifying
Valtteri Bottas set the fastest time in the first half-hour free practice session that was held prior to the first qualifying session, but he and defending race-winner Edoardo Mortara were split by just 0.01 seconds. Mortara's teammate Laurens Vanthoor completed the session in third place, marginally faster than Bottas' teammate Roberto Merhi, with Carlos Huertas completing the top five, just over a second off the pace. Renger van der Zande rounded out the top six, in a crash-filled session with four drivers – Daniel Abt, Felix Rosenqvist, Rio Haryanto and Kimiya Sato – hitting the wall, with William Buller and Michael Ho also having excursions down escape roads.

The first qualifying session saw Mortara on top, reversing the result from the practice session as Bottas wound up second. Mortara only secured the top spot, after a late crash by Carlin's Jazeman Jaafar at Fishermen's Bend, which stopped the other drivers from improving their times. Marco Wittmann was top rookie as he ended up third ahead of Vanthoor and Huertas. Van der Zande finished the session in sixth place ahead of rookies Felipe Nasr and James Calado with Alexandre Imperatori and Abt rounding out the top ten. Fortec Motorsport and Carlin provisionally filled the next two rows with Oliver Webb getting the better of one of his rivals from the British Formula 3 season, Jean-Éric Vergne, with Buller and António Félix da Costa filling row seven. Japanese trio Yuhi Sekiguchi, Hideki Yamauchi and Yuji Kunimoto were next up ahead of Formula 3 Euro Series runners Alexander Sims and Merhi. Jaafar ended the session in 20th after his late incident, ahead of Haryanto, Lucas Foresti, Hywel Lloyd, Sato, Rosenqvist, Rafael Suzuki, Adderly Fong, Daniel Juncadella – who also crashed at Fishermen's – and Ho. Carlos Muñoz had set the 26th-fastest time but was excluded from the session for missing the weighbridge. Muñoz was also among eight drivers to receive a five-place grid penalty for the qualification race by ignoring yellow flags, as well as Calado, Sekiguchi, Buller, Foresti, Webb, Yamauchi and Huertas.

In second practice, which had been reduced to a half-hour session from 45 minutes, Bottas and Mortara fought for the top spot again, with Bottas coming out on top by six tenths of a second with his final lap of the session. Wittmann, Huertas and Merhi filled out the rest of the top five, the only other drivers to be within two seconds of the pace set by Bottas. Setting the theme of a crash-filled day on the streets of Macau, Calado and Buller crashed at Fishermen's, Muñoz at Police, while Haryanto brought out a red flag for crashing at the tricky final corner, R Bend. Delays caused after the session in support races and in the WTCC qualifying session meant that the second qualifying session scheduled for Friday afternoon was moved to Saturday morning.

When second qualifying finally did take place, Mortara set the pace again before the first of two red flags for Fong hitting the wall at the Solitude Esses. Mortara's teammate Vanthoor then usurped his time before the second red flag for Kunimoto hitting the wall, again at Solitude. With eight minutes remaining in the session, Mortara then returned to the top of the standings, having improved on his Thursday time by nearly two seconds. Signature had a 1-2-3-4 clean sweep until the last lap of the session when Bottas found a clear run to vault his way back into second. Vanthoor and Abt moved ahead of Wittmann with Merhi moving up to sixth. After Huertas' penalty, Rosenqvist, van der Zande, Juncadella, Vergne and Félix da Costa all moved up on the grid. Sims was also penalised ten places on the grid for an engine change dropping him to 20th on the grid. The rest of the grid lined up as Jaafar, Lloyd, Nasr, Imperatori, Suzuki, Calado, Webb, Sims and Muñoz (after penalties), Haryanto, Foresti, Kunimoto, Sato, Ho, Sekiguchi, Buller, Yamauchi and Fong. As well as the red flag-causing incidents, Vergne, Buller, Webb and Félix da Costa also hit the barriers.

Qualification Race
At the start, Mortara and Bottas made similar starts but behind them, Abt made the best start and went three-wide with Mortara and Bottas on the run to the Mandarin and took the lead on the exit. Mortara regained the tow behind his teammate and reclaimed the lead into Lisboa. Behind the leaders, Nasr ran wide and almost hit the wall on the outside of the bend but Calado lost rear grip on his car and spun into the barriers. As he came back across the circuit, Sims spun to avoid him and also hit the barriers, but on the inside. Further down the road, Webb ran into the barriers at Lisboa and became the race's third retirement. Despite extensive debris, the race continued under green flag conditions.

With Abt, Bottas and Vanthoor battling over second place, Mortara extended a margin out front of over two seconds after the first lap. Abt defended second place on lap two, but on the run to Lisboa on lap three, Vanthoor, having passed Bottas the previous lap drafted past his teammate and into second place. Lloyd departed the race on lap two, becoming the fourth of the five British drivers to retire from the race. Bottas' teammate Merhi soon caught up to the pack and moved ahead of the Zandvoort Masters winner and into fourth place. With three laps to go, Merhi moved into third ahead of Abt but soon developed a problem, which saw him outbraked by both Abt and Bottas at Lisboa on lap nine, and later fell down the order to an eventual 22nd place classification. On the same lap as Merhi moved into third, Imperatori also exited the race at Lisboa and became the final retirement of the race.

Mortara's pace dropped towards the end but he was still over two seconds clear of Vanthoor at the race's conclusion. Abt completed the podium, giving Signature a clean sweep. Bottas finished fourth ahead of Wittmann, van der Zande, Vergne, Huertas, Félix da Costa and Juncadella. Outside the top ten, Rosenqvist finished eleventh ahead of Nasr, Jaafar, Haryanto, Foresti, Muñoz, Kunimoto, Suzuki, Buller, Sekiguchi, Yamauchi, Merhi, Fong, Ho and Sato rounded out the 25 classified finishers.

Main Race
At the start, the Signature cars of Mortara, Vanthoor and Abt all made decent getaways while chaos ensued in the midfield. Muñoz ran into the back of the stalled Haryanto, and both those drivers were out on the spot. Muñoz's crabbed Dallara also took out two further Räikkönen Robertson Racing cars as Sims, starting last after his crash at the Mandarin on Saturday, rammed into the back of Ho and both drivers were out as they could not separate themselves. Sato also picked up damage and pitted at the end of the lap. Mortara held the lead into Lisboa ahead of Abt, Vanthoor, Bottas, Wittmann and van der Zande. Vergne and Juncadella also battled over eighth position at the corner, with Juncadella ending up in the barrier after running wide. Unsurprisingly, the safety car was deployed to clean the circuit, but the debris was quickly removed and by the end of the next lap, the safety car pulled in.

Racing resumed with Mortara making a sluggish restart allowing both Abt and Vanthoor to attack for the lead down to Lisboa, running three-wide at one point. Abt made the best move to the inside and took the lead of the race. Ultimately, it was to be a short run out front for Abt, as later on the lap, he hit the barriers at the Solitude Esses and was lucky not to be collected by Vanthoor, or any other drivers as his car skated along the wall on the tight, upper portion of the circuit. The safety car was called upon with Vanthoor now out front with Mortara, Bottas, Wittmann and Félix da Costa, who had passed van der Zande before the safety car was redeployed early on lap four. The safety car pitted at the end of lap six after a period to clear Abt's car from the track.

Mortara's pace picked up and he made short work of Vanthoor, taking the lead at Lisboa, and would not be headed again as he became the first driver to win consecutive Formula Three Macau Grands Prix. Vanthoor held second to the end, holding off increasing pressure from Bottas, but due to a lack of straight-line speed down to his less-powerful Mercedes engine, Bottas could not stay with Vanthoor and thus negated a chance to pass. Wittmann ran a lonely race to fourth ahead of van der Zande, who repassed Félix da Costa on lap eleven. Vergne was seventh ahead of Merhi, who avoided the start-line shunt to move up from 22nd to eighth, with the top ten rounded out by Rosenqvist and Huertas. Outside the top ten, Nasr finished eleventh ahead of Imperatori, who also moved up fourteen from his start position, Yamauchi was 13th ahead of Jaafar, Buller, Kunimoto, Suzuki, Webb, Calado, Sekiguchi, Fong, Foresti, Lloyd and Sato rounded out the 24 classified finishers.

Classification

Qualifying
 Qualifying was split into two sessions, both of which being 45 minutes. One session was held on November 18 and another was held on November 20, with the best times of each driver counting towards the grid for the qualifying race.

1. – Eight drivers were given five-place grid penalties for the qualification race, for breaching yellow flag regulations.
2. – Sims was penalised ten places for an engine change.
3. – Muñoz's times from the first session were annulled for ignoring the weighbridge during the session.

Qualification Race

Main Race

References

External links
 The official website of the 57th Macau Grand Prix

Macau
Macau Grand Prix
Macau Grand Prix
Macau Grand Prix Formula Three